The Gift or The Gifts may refer to:

Art 
 The Gift (sculpture), an early readymade by Man Ray

Literature

Nonfiction and anthologies 
 The Gift (essay), a 1925 sociology/anthropology essay by Marcel Mauss
 The Gift: Imagination and the Erotic Life of Property, a 1983 book by Lewis Hyde
 The Gift: How the Creative Spirit Transforms the World, the 2006 title for Lewis Hyde's book
 The Gift: Creativity and the Artist in the Modern World, the 2007 title for Lewis Hyde's book
 The Gift, a 1960 memoir by the poet H.D.
 The Gift, a 19th-century annual gift book edited by Eliza Leslie

Fiction 
 The Gift (Croggon novel), a 2002 novel by Alison Croggon
 The Gift (Douglas novel), a 1992 novel by Kirk Douglas
 The Gift (Nabokov novel), a 1938 novel by Vladimir Nabokov
 The Gift (Steel novel), 1994 Danielle Steel novel
 The Gift, a 2008 novel by Cecelia Ahern
 The Gift, a 1973 novel by Pete Hamill
 The Gift, a 1973 novel by Peter Dickinson
 The Gift, a 1998 novel by Patrick O'Leary
 The Gift, a 2004 novel by David Flusfeder
 The Gift, a 2007 novel by Richard Paul Evans

Film 
 Le Cadeau (French, "The Gift"), a French and Italian comedy film
 The Gifts, a 1970 documentary
 The Gift (1979 film), a TV movie starring Glenn Ford
 The Gift (1994 film), a 30-minute TV film directed by Laura Dern
 The Gift (2000 film), an American supernatural suspense film directed by Sam Raimi
 The Gift (2003 film), a documentary by Louise Hogarth
 The Gift (2009 film) or Echelon Conspiracy, a science fiction action thriller
 The Gift, a 2010 American film featuring Jamie Hector
 The Gift (2014 film), an Irish film
 The Gift (2015 American film), an American thriller film, directed by Joel Edgerton
 The Gift (2015 Scottish film), Scottish short film
 The Gift, a 2016 short animated film by Marza Animation Planet

Television 
 The Gift, a 1989 British television play by Colin MacDonald
 The Gift (British TV series), a 1990 series featuring Jeff Rawle
 The Gift (1997 TV series), an Australian children's series
 The Gift (2013 TV series), a 2013 Philippine drama series
 The Gift (2007 TV program), an Australian medical documentary program
 The Gift, a 1998 British drama starring Amanda Burton
 The Gift (2019 Philippine TV series), a 2019 Philippine drama series
 The Gift (Turkish TV series), a 2019 Netflix original fantasy series
 The Gift (audio drama), an audio play based on the series Doctor Who

Episodes 
 "The Gift" (Bonanza)
 "The Gift" (Buffy the Vampire Slayer)
 "The Gift" (Dilbert)
 "The Gift" (FlashForward)
 "The Gift" (Game of Thrones)
 "The Gift" (Gimme a Break!)
 "The Gift" (Law & Order: Criminal Intent)
 "The Gift" (Matlock)
 "The Gift" (The New Adventures of He-Man)
 "The Gift" (The Sarah Jane Adventures)
 "The Gift" (Star Trek: Voyager)
 "The Gift" (Stargate Atlantis)
 "The Gift" (Three's Company)
 "The Gift" (The Twilight Zone)
 "The Gift" (The X-Files)
 "The Gift", an episode of Challenge of the GoBots

Music

Bands 
 The Gift (band), a Portuguese pop/rock band

Albums 
 The Gift (Andre Nickatina album), or the title song
 The Gift (Bizzy Bone album)
 The Gift (Big Mello album)
 The Gift (Charles Moffett album), or the title song
 The Gift (Corrinne May album), or the title song
 The Gift (David "Fathead" Newman album), or the title song
 The Gift (The Jam album), or the title song
 The Gift (John Zorn album)
 The Gift (Kenny Rogers album)
 The Gift (Midge Ure album), or the title song
 The Gift (Susan Boyle album)
 The Gift (Master P album)
 The Gift, by Larry Carlton
 The Gift, by Jim Brickman

Songs 
 "The Gift" (INXS song)
 "The Gift" (Jim Brickman song)
 "The Gift" (The McCarters song)
 "The Gift" (Seether song)
 "The Gift" (The Velvet Underground song)
 "The Gift" (Way Out West song)
 "The Gift", a song by Angels & Airwaves from We Don't Need to Whisper
 "The Gift", a song by Five Bolt Main from Venting
 "The Gift", a song by Slapshock from  Novena
 "The Gift", a song by Tony Banks from Still
 "The Gift", a song by Annie Lennox from Diva
 "The Gift", a song by Eric Prydz from Eric Prydz Presents Pryda
 "The Gift", a song by Garth Brooks from Beyond the Season
 "The Gift", a song by Collin Raye

Other 
 The Gift, a composition by Terry Riley

See also 
 Gift (disambiguation)
 Present (disambiguation)